Raymond Leslie Jones (born 17 February 1924) is a former Australian rules footballer who played with Geelong in the Victorian Football League (VFL).

Notes

External links 

Possibly living people
1924 births
Australian rules footballers from Victoria (Australia)
Geelong Football Club players